The Horhe is a family of Russian non-lethal pistols, based on Ukrainian Fort 12 and Fort 17 pistols, Horhe are produced since 2006 by joint-stock company Klimovsk Specialized Ammunition Plant.

Design details
The main parts of the gun are made from steel and hardened in a vacuum. Some guns are manufactured wholly or partially from stainless steel. The barrel is made from stainless steel.

The pistol is equipped with a self-cocking trigger hammer type double-acting SA/DA. The design provides slide catch holding the bolt after firing the last bullet in the rearward position. Blowback action (no barrel grip with a bolt, locking the barrel reached the mass closure and force the return spring).

Commercially available ammunition include blanks and cartridges loaded with tear gas or rubber bullets.

Variants 
 Horhe (Хорхе) - a civilian model with metal frame
 Horhe-1 (Хорхе-1) - a civilian model with a polymer frame.
 Horhe-S (Хорхе-С) - "service model" for private security guards with metal frame.
Horhe-1S (Хорхе-1С) - "service model" for private security guards with polymer frame.
Horhe-2 (Хорхе-2) - new civilian model.
Horhe-3 (Хорхе-3) - new civilian model with updated version of the bolt and the polymer frame made from durable plastic.
Horhe-3S (Хорхе-3 Спорт) - an updated version of the bolt and the polymer frame, with a barrel without obstacles, made from durable plastic with the addition of fiberglass.

Accessories 
On pistols with polymer frame can be installed laser sight and gun-mounted flashlight.

Legal status
  - The use of non-lethal weapons in Russia is permitted to civil population, and it is also used by private security.
  - The use of non-lethal weapons is permitted to civil population, and it is also used by private security guards

References

External links 
 KSPZ
 Overview of the gun
 Russia.ru Сюжет "Police Gun"

Non-lethal firearms of Russia
Semi-automatic pistols of Russia